T. F. Howard Palmer ( – November 18, 1969) was a Canadian curler. 

Palmer was the skip of the 1941 Brier Champion team, representing Alberta. He also won the Centennial Championship in Hamilton, Ontario, 1956. 

A native of Calgary, Palmer was inducted into the Alberta Sports Hall of Fame in 1970. He died in 1969 at the age of 62 in Lethbridge.

References

1900s births
1969 deaths

Year of birth uncertain
Alberta Sports Hall of Fame inductees
Brier champions
Canadian male curlers
Curlers from Calgary